Ratanpur railway station is a railway station on Sahibganj loop line under the Malda railway division of Eastern Railway zone. It is situated at Itahari, Ratanpur in Munger district in the Indian state of Bihar.

Lines 
Traveling south-west, Kiul Junction railway station is the main station next to Jamalpur. Going east,  is the nearest main station. A mega Munger Ganga Bridge connects it to nearby districts like Begusarai, Khagaria and various districts of North Bihar .

References

Railway stations in Munger district
Malda railway division